Ballot Initiative 933  was a ballot initiative in the U.S. state of Washington in 2006. It concerned land use planning, and was voted down by 59% in the 2006 elections.

The controversial initiative pitted the interests of real estate developers against environmental protection and preservation of natural resources.

The initiative is also known as I-933, titled "Property Rights" by the Secretary of State, "The Property Fairness Initiative" by its supporters, and the "Developers Initiative" by its opponents.

Content of the proposal
I-933 called for government agencies in the State of Washington to evaluate the effects directly on private real and personal property when implementing regulations or ordinances. It called for these government agencies to follow certain policies: either pay compensation when "damaging" property, to consider "less restrictive means," or to waive the implementation of the regulation.

Cost
According to a study conducted by the University of Washington the initiative would have cost taxpayers an estimated $7.8 Billion during the first five years after enactment. The same study also found that "Virtually every county would likely be faced with claims, yet none have a tax revenue source in place for paying them."

Other effects
I-933 would have impacted critical areas that are protected to prevent flooding and protect fish, wildlife and groundwater.
Though it was described as establishing a "pay or waive" system, I-933 did not have the power to permit waivers in most relevant cases. This would have resulted in a "stymied decision" and uncertainty for both landowners and local governments, with the result of slowing down development permits.

I-933 would likely have led to a greater role for federal government in the region.

The initiative would have had implications not only for real estate, but on intellectual property rights, water rights, motor vehicles, securities and intangible commercial assets.

People and organizations involved

Supporters
Supporters of I-933 argued that the proposal would have protected private property owners from "excessive land-use regulations or proposed regulations that damage the use and value of private property."

A significant portion of the financial support for the campaign came from Americans for Limited Government, a libertarian-oriented group based in Illinois.

Other supporters of the measure included:

Bainbridge Citizens United
Spokane Pro-America
Washington Cattleman's Association
Washington Contract Loggers Association
Farm Bureaus from Washington State

Opponents
Opponents of the initiative questioned why taxpayers should have "to pay some land owners to follow laws already on the books or waive those protections for the community". I-933 required taxpayers to pay legal fees for all claims, including retroactive claims. Opponents of the proposal also pointed out that the Washington Farm Bureau represents primarily large corporations and has an established record of supporting Republican candidates with PAC money. The Association of Washington Cities argued the Initiative would have cost taxpayers 4.5 billion dollars a year in claims against municipalities. Environmentalists claimed "Initiative 933 would dismantle ... (environmental) protections, making it extremely difficult to enforce the Clean Air Act and the Clean Water Act." Moreover, I-933 allocated no funding for the payments it required, raising fears that taxes would have been increased and/or that funding to key infrastructural programs would have been cut. Lobbyists in favor of the bill dismissed these accusations as scare tactics. On October 10, 2006, all six of Washington's living former governors joined current Gov. Christine Gregoire to oppose Initiative 933. "I-933 is an extremely vague and loophole-ridden initiative that exposes our taxpayers to great expense," said former Gov. Gary Locke.

Organizations that opposed the initiative included:

 Former Governors Booth Gardner (D), Daniel J. Evans (R), Gary Locke (D), Mike Lowry (D), John Spellman (R)
 State Senators Luke Esser (R), Mary Margaret Haugen (D)
 State Representatives Fred Jarrett (R), Sam Hunt (D)
 American Institute of Architects, Washington Council and Seattle Chapter
 Greater Seattle Chamber of Commerce
 American Planning Association
 Washington State Building Trades
 AFSCME - Washington State Council of County & City Employees
 Washington State Labor Council
 Various neighborhood associations
 Washington Association of Churches
 American Lung Association of Washington
 Washington Physicians for Social Responsibility
 National Wildlife Federation
 United Farm Workers
 Amalgamated Transit Union Locals 1015 and 757
 American Federation of State, County, and Municipal Employees - Councils 2 and 28
 International Brotherhood of Electrical Workers Locals 112 and 483
 Ironworkers Local 14
 National Association of Letter Carriers 791
 Service Employees International Union, Washington State Council
 UNITE HERE Local 8
 United Food and Commercial Workers - Washington State Council and Local 21
 Democracy for America (Bellingham and Kitsap Bainbridge)
 Washington State Democrats, and 12 county committees and 17 legislative districts
 King County Young Democrats
 Green Party of Washington State
 League of Women Voters of Washington
 Permanent Defense
 American Federation of Teachers, Washington
 Audubon Society Washington
 Sierra Club Northwest and Cascade Chapter
 Surfrider Foundation Northwest Straits and Seattle Chapters
 The Nature Conservancy of Washington
 Cascade Bicycle Club
 Washington Conservation Voters
 Affiliated Tribes of Northwest Indians

Precedents
I-933 was similar to Initiative 164, a 1995 bill passed by the Washington legislature and subsequently repealed by ballot initiative (referendum 48.)

It was also similar to Oregon Ballot Measure 37 (2004), as well as numerous 2006 initiatives promoted in other states (nearly all of which were defeated.)

References

External links
 An article on the projected costs of I-933
 An article comparing I-933 to Oregon's Measure 37
 An article in the Seattle Times examining public perception of I-933
Full text of the Washington Constitution provided by the Washington State Legislature 
 The Nature Conservancy's analysis of I-933
  The Oregonian "fact box" regarding Americans for Limited Government
 An analysis of the ecological impact of I-933

Environment of Washington (state)
2006 Washington (state) ballot measures
Initiatives in the United States